Rafael Arozarena (April 4, 1923 – September 30, 2009) was a Spanish poet and novelist, born in Tenerife, Canary Islands. He studied medicine and after that he started writing books, because writing was what he liked the most and what he usually did. He spent his youth under the influence of the Spanish Civil War (1936–1939) and the post-war. He studied Art so, apart from writing, he can also draw. He joined in a literary group called 'Los Fetasianos' (Fetasiano group) with some of his friends.

His first stories appeared in the 1940s in a magazine called Arco. About ten years later, he started to write for a newspaper and all through his life he published six books: Alto crecen los cardos, Aprisa cantan los gallos, El omnibus pintado con cerezas, Silbato de tinta amarilla and Cerveza de grano rojo. However, his most important book is Mararía, which is famous all round the world and which has also be made into a film. In 1988, he received the most important literary prize in the Canary Islands. Until his death in 2009, he lived in Bajamar, La Laguna (Tenerife).

Poetry 
Romancero Canario (1946)
A la Sombra de los Cuervos (1947)
Aprisa Cantan los Gallos (1964)
El omnibús Pintado con Cerezas (1971)
Desfile Otoñal de los Obispos Licenciosos(1985)
Altos Crecen los Cardos (1959)
Silbato de Tinta Amarilla (1977)
Amor de la Mora (1989)

Novels 
Mararía (1973)
Cerveza de grano rojo (1984)

Children's novels 
La Garza y la Violeta (1998)
El Dueño del Arco-Iris (2002)

1923 births
Spanish male writers
2009 deaths
Spanish poets
Spanish novelists